Ayrshire Hospital may refer to:

 Ayrshire Central Hospital, Irvine, Ayrshire, Scotland, UK
 Ayrshire District Asylum, Ayr, Ayrshire, Scotland, UK
 East Ayrshire Community Hospital, Cumnock, Ayrshire, Scotland, UK

See also
 NHS Ayrshire and Arran, a national health region
 Ayr Hospital (disambiguation)
 Ayrshire (disambiguation)